Die hard often refers to die hard (phrase), one not easily swayed from a belief.

Die hard may also refer to:

Arts, entertainment, and media

Films
Die Hard (film series), which includes:
Die Hard
Die Hard 2
Die Hard with a Vengeance
Live Free or Die Hard (also known as Die Hard 4.0)
A Good Day to Die Hard

Video games
Die Hard video games, based on the films:
Die Hard (video game) for Nintendo Entertainment System, Commodore 64, TurboGrafx-16, and DOS  
Die Hard Arcade for arcade and Sega Saturn
Die Hard Trilogy for PC, Sony PlayStation, and Saturn
Die Hard Trilogy 2: Viva Las Vegas for PC and PlayStation
Die Hard: Nakatomi Plaza for PC
Die Hard: Vendetta for Nintendo GameCube, Microsoft Xbox, and Sony PlayStation 2

Music
"Die Hard", a song by Venom Lant, Dunn, Bray, 1983
"Die Hard" (Dr. Dre song)
"Die Hard", a song by Kendrick Lamar from his 2022 album Mr. Morale & the Big Steppers

Others
 DieHard (brand), a line of batteries marketed by Advance Auto Parts
 Diehard tests, a battery of statistical tests for random number generators
 Diehard, a pattern in the Game of Life
 Die-Hards, nickname of the Middlesex Regiment of the British Army
 Talladega DieHard 500, a former NASCAR race

See also 
 Speed (1994 film), sometimes referred to as "Die Hard on a bus"
 Air Force One (film), sometimes described as "Die Hard on a plane"

ru:Крепкий орешек